Dezhou East railway station is a high-speed railway station in Dezhou, Shandong, China. It is served by the Beijing–Shanghai high-speed railway and the Shijiazhuang–Jinan passenger railway.

Railway stations in Shandong
Railway stations in China opened in 2011
Stations on the Qingdao–Taiyuan High-Speed Railway